Zeno Dragomir (27 June 1923 – 1967) was a Romanian pole vaulter.  He competed at the 1952 Olympics in Helsinki and placed 18th.

References

1923 births
1967 deaths
Romanian male pole vaulters
Olympic pole vaulters
Olympic athletes of Romania
Athletes (track and field) at the 1952 Summer Olympics